Satara cornutiata is a moth in the family Erebidae. It was described by Jagbir Singh Kirti and Navneet Singh Gill in 2008. It is known from Karnataka in southern India.

References

Moths described in 2008
Spilosomina